Joe Seneca (January 14, 1919 – August 15, 1996) was an American actor, singer, and songwriter. He is best known for Willie Brown in  Crossroads (1986), Dr. Meadows in The Blob (1988), and Dr. Hanes in The Cosby Show.

Life and career
Seneca was born Joel Seneca McGhee, Jr. in Cleveland, Ohio. Before his acting career, he belonged to the R&B singing group The Three Riffs, which was active from the late 1940s and performed at upscale supper clubs in New York City. He was also a songwriter and had big hits with "Talk to Me", sung by Little Willie John, and "Break It to Me Gently," which was a smash hit by Brenda Lee in 1962 and by Juice Newton in 1982.

In the 1982 film, The Verdict, Seneca plays the supporting role of Dr. Thompson, a small-town women's hospital physician brought in by attorney Frank Galvin (Paul Newman) to support his belief that two famous doctors' incompetence left his client alive but in a coma. Arguably his most well-known roles are that of bluesman Willie Brown in Crossroads (1986) and Dr. Meddows in The Blob (1988), the evil head of a government team sent to contain the title creature.

Seneca also made multiple appearances on The Cosby Show as Hillman President Dr. Zachariah J. Hanes. He also played Alvin Newcastle, a man suffering from Alzheimer's disease, on an episode of The Golden Girls titled "Old Friends". Seneca appeared in Spike Lee's School Daze as Mission College President McPherson.

Seneca played Eddie Haynes on Matlock in the May 9, 1989 episode "The Blues Singer." He later played a murder witness in the October 13, 1993 Law & Order episode "Profile."

Seneca appeared in Michael Jackson's "The Way You Make Me Feel" music video in 1987.

Seneca played "Blind Otis Lemon", based on Muddy Waters, a homeless blues legend who gets one last chance to sing and play in a club the night before an operation that may leave him deaf, on Doogie Howser, M.D., season 2 episode 6, "Doogie Sings the Blues", October 17, 1990.

He died from coronary arrest or asthma August 15, 1996 at the age of 77. He was married to his wife, Betty Seneca, until his death.

Filmography

References

External links

New York Times: Joe Seneca, a Character Actor In 'Ma Rainey's Black Bottom' 

1919 births
1996 deaths
Songwriters from Ohio
African-American male actors
American male film actors
American male television actors
Male actors from Cleveland
People from Roosevelt Island
20th-century American male actors
20th-century American singers
Deaths from asthma
20th-century American male singers
20th-century African-American male singers
American male songwriters